The Riviera Nayarit Classic was an annual golf tournament for professional women golfers on the Symetra Tour, the LPGA Tour's developmental tour. It was the first full-field event on the Symetra Tour to be played outside the United States. It is played at El Tigre Golf and Country Club in Nuevo Vallarta, Nayarit, Mexico.

The tournament was a 54-hole event, as are most Symetra Tour tournaments, and included pre-tournament pro-am, in which local amateur golfers can play with the professional golfers from the Tour as a benefit for local charities.

Tournament names through the years:
2010: Riviera Nayarit Classic
2011: Santorini Riviera Nayarit Classic
2012: Riviera Nayarit Classic

Winners

Tournament records

References

External links
Symetra Tour official website

Former Symetra Tour events
Golf tournaments in Mexico
Sport in Nayarit
Recurring sporting events established in 2010
Recurring sporting events disestablished in 2012
2010 establishments in Mexico
2012 disestablishments in Mexico
Defunct sports competitions in Mexico